Phryganeopsis is a genus of moths belonging to the family Tineidae. It contains only one species, Phryganeopsis brunnea, which is found in California.

References

Tineidae
Monotypic moth genera
Moths described in 1881
Moths of North America
Tineidae genera
Taxa named by Thomas de Grey, 6th Baron Walsingham